The Spectacular Now is a 2013 American coming-of-age romantic drama film directed by James Ponsoldt, from a screenplay written by Scott Neustadter and Michael H. Weber, based on the 2008 novel of the same name by Tim Tharp. It stars Miles Teller and Shailene Woodley as high-schoolers Sutter and Aimee, whose unexpected encounter leads to a romance blossoming between the two. Brie Larson, Mary Elizabeth Winstead, Bob Odenkirk, Jennifer Jason Leigh, and Kyle Chandler are featured in supporting roles.

The Spectacular Now premiered at the 2013 Sundance Film Festival, and was theatrically released in the United States on August 2, 2013 where the film garnered critical acclaim, and grossed over $6 million worldwide. It received two nominations at the 29th Independent Spirit Awards: Best Female Lead (for Woodley) and Best Screenplay.

Plot
Sutter Keely (Teller) is a charming and popular 18-year-old who has spent his senior year of high school partying and drinking alcohol. When his girlfriend Cassidy Roy (Larson) breaks up with him, Sutter goes home and writes a college application supplement, in which he says that his biggest hardship in life has been getting dumped by her. He goes out and gets blackout drunk after sneaking into a bar.

The next morning, Sutter is woken up on a front lawn by Aimee Finecky (Woodley), a girl in his year whose name he does not know. Aimee is in the middle of her mother's paper route, and Sutter joins her to track down his car. The next day, he asks her to tutor him in geometry. He learns that she is smart, funny and into sci-fi and comics. Sutter goes home and deletes the supplement he wrote about his life's biggest hardship. He takes Aimee to a party the next day, and they go for a walk and drink. Aimee confesses she has never been drunk before, never had a boyfriend and does not think she can go to college because she has to take care of her mother. Sutter tells her she is not responsible for her mother before complimenting and kissing her.

The next morning, Sutter wakes up hungover and realizes that he asked Aimee to prom at the party. He avoids Aimee during school and goes to Cassidy's house that night. They get drunk in her room and reminisce, but Cassidy tells him they have no future together and asks him to leave. After Aimee's friend warns Sutter not to hurt Aimee, Sutter takes Aimee to dinner at his sister Holly's house, where Aimee talks frankly about the death of her father from an opiate overdose and her dreams of a perfect marriage. Sutter and Aimee's relationship grows more serious and they eventually have sex. Afterward, Sutter confesses that his mother Sara (Leigh) kicked his father Tommy (Chandler) out when he was a child and has forbidden Sutter from seeing him, and the pair makes a pact to stand up to their mothers.

On prom night, Sutter gifts Aimee a flask so they can drink together. After the dance, Aimee tells him that she is going to college in Philadelphia near her sister, who can help her find an apartment and a job. She asks Sutter to come with her and go to junior college, and he hesitantly agrees. Sutter gets his father's phone number from Holly and arranges to meet up to attend a baseball game, bringing Aimee with him. Tommy answers the door, under the influence, and admits he forgot about their plans and instead takes them to a local bar. Midway through the night, Tommy picks up a woman, asks Sutter to pick up the tab and to meet him back at his motel. But when he fails to arrive, they find him immediately back at the bar drinking with his friends. Sutter and Aimee leave, heartbroken.

Aimee attempts to comfort Sutter and says she loves him, but Sutter, angry and drunk, snaps at her. After almost causing an accident, he tells her he is bad for her and forces her out of the car. Aimee, crying and not paying attention to the road, is clipped by a passing car. Aimee's arm is broken but she forgives Sutter for the incident. After the graduation ceremony, Sutter refuses to drink with Aimee and talks to Cassidy, who tells Sutter that she is moving to California with her boyfriend. Later, Sutter's boss tells him he can only afford to keep one employee and would like to keep Sutter, who is good with customers, but only if he no longer keeps working drunk. Unable to guarantee his sobriety, Sutter quits.

Sutter drives past Aimee, who is waiting for him by the bus to Philadelphia, leaving her heartbroken. He gets drunk at a bar, drives home and totals his mailbox. After an argument with Sara, Sutter reassesses his life and completes the personal statement for his college application, despite having missed the submission deadline. He confesses that his biggest hardship is himself and his insistence to only live in the moment. He drives to Philadelphia and finds Aimee as she is leaving class. They make eye contact, and Aimee smiles ambivalently before the scene cuts.

Cast

Production
The rights to the novel were first acquired by Fox Searchlight Pictures in 2009. Marc Webb, who had already directed Neustadter and Weber's script for 500 Days of Summer, was set to direct the film. According to Ponsoldt, Webb left the film to work on The Amazing Spider-Man, and Searchlight lost the rights after that.

Principal photography commenced in Athens, Georgia, in July 2012 and wrapped a month later. While the novel is set in Oklahoma, director James Ponsoldt preferred to shoot in his hometown; he explained:

The script didn't identify where it was set – the setting just wasn't a big city. It felt vaguely suburban – or kind of like a college town. It seemed to me that the script had a sense of place in the way that Breaking Away did. Athens was such an obvious candidate as a setting to shoot the film in – and it was really the only place I wanted to make the film. Filming in Athens was incredibly meaningful to me. We shot in the streets and houses of my childhood!

Reception

Box office
The Spectacular Now opened in limited release in North America on August 2, 2013, in four theaters and grossed $197,415 with an average of $49,354 per theater and ranking #30 at the box office. The film's wide release was in 770 theaters and it ended up earning $6.9 million domestically and an additional $63,980 elsewhere for a total of $6.9 million, against its $2.5 million budget.

Critical response
The Spectacular Now was warmly received at the 2013 Sundance Film Festival. On Rotten Tomatoes the film has an approval rating of 91% based on 168 reviews, with an average rating of 7.78/10. The site's critical consensus reads, "The Spectacular Now is an adroit, sensitive film that avoids typical coming-of-age story trappings." On Metacritic the film has a score of 82 out of 100, based on 42 critics, indicating "universal acclaim".

Roger Ebert, in one of the last reviews of his life, awarded the film a full four stars, stating in his review:

Here is a lovely film about two high school seniors who look, speak and feel like real 18-year-old middle-American human beings. Do you have any idea how rare that is? They aren't crippled by irony. They aren't speeded up into cartoons. Their sex lives aren't insulted by scenes that treat them cheaply [...] What an affecting film this is. It respects its characters and doesn't use them for its own shabby purposes. How deeply we care about them. Miles Teller and Shailene Woodley are so there. Being young is a solemn business when you really care about someone. Teller has a touch of John Cusack in his Say Anything period. Woodley is beautiful in a real person sort of way, studying him with concern, and then that warm smile. We have gone through senior year with these two. We have known them. We have been them.

Richard Roeper of the Chicago Sun-Times also gave the film four stars out of four, describing it as "the best American movie of the year so far". He summarized his review by adding: "The Spectacular Now will bring you back to that time in your life when you were trying to soak in every moment, because everyone told you there's nothing better than your last year in high school." In The Hollywood Reporter, critic Todd McCarthy called the film "a sincere, refreshingly unaffected look at teenagers and their attitudes about the future... Ordinary in some ways and extraordinary in others, The Spectacular Now benefits from an exceptional feel for its main characters on the parts of the director and lead actors."

Dana Stevens of Slate also praised both the leads, commenting that "Miles Teller and Shailene Woodley have such a disarmingly direct and spontaneous connection as actors that Sutter and Aimee almost immediately come to seem like a couple you've known (or been part of) at some point in your life... The Spectacular Now captures the beauty and scariness and lacerating intensity of first love". Entertainment Weekly critic Owen Gleiberman described it as "one of the rare truly soulful and authentic teen movies." He compared it favorably to Say Anything... and The Perks of Being a Wallflower, saying "like them, it's a movie about the experience of being caught on the cusp and truly not knowing which way you'll land."

In Variety, critic Rob Nelson wrote: "The scars and blemishes on the faces of the high-school lovers in The Spectacular Now are beautifully emblematic of director James Ponsoldt's bid to bring the American teen movie back to some semblance of reality, a bid that pays off spectacularly indeed." Cinema Blend called it "the rare Sundance coming-of-age story that feels like it matters", adding: "The Spectacular Now is an instant MVP of the first half of the festival, with potential breakout hit written all over it... you'll be hearing a lot about this one down the road, and it's got the goods to live up to the hype." Phoebe Reilly of Spin called the film "the next great teen movie" and "truly remarkable". She acclaimed Teller and Woodley for their "absurdly natural performances", with Sutter "uniquely irresistible" and Aimee "a perfect repertoire of nervous giggles and awkward mannerisms."

Accolades
At the 2013 Sundance Film Festival, The Spectacular Now received the Special Jury Award for Acting.

References

External links

 
 
 
 

2013 films
2010s coming-of-age comedy-drama films
2013 independent films
2013 romantic comedy-drama films
2010s teen comedy-drama films
2010s teen romance films
American coming-of-age comedy-drama films
American independent films
American romantic comedy-drama films
American teen comedy-drama films
American teen romance films
Coming-of-age romance films
Films about alcoholism
Films about drugs
Films about virginity
Films based on American novels
Films directed by James Ponsoldt
Films scored by Rob Simonsen
Films shot in Georgia (U.S. state)
A24 (company) films
21 Laps Entertainment films
Films with screenplays by Scott Neustadter and Michael H. Weber
2013 comedy films
2013 drama films
2010s English-language films
2010s American films